Orcés’s long-tongued bat (Lonchophylla orcesi) is a species of leaf-nosed bat found in Ecuador.

Taxonomy and etymology
It was described as a new species in 2005. The holotype was collected in 1985. The eponym for the species name "orcesi" is Gustavo Orcés, a "pioneer of Ecuadorian research on vertebrates."

Description
Its back fur is pale brown, while its belly fur is a paler, yellowish-gray brown. Its nose-leaf, ears, tragi, and uropatagium are blackish in color.

Range and habitat
It is endemic to Ecuador. The one known individual was collected within the Cotacachi Cayapas Ecological Reserve, a "very humid pre-montane forest." 

As of 2015, it is evaluated as data deficient by the IUCN. The holotype is the only individual to have been documented, as of 2015.

References

Bats of South America
Endemic fauna of Ecuador
Mammals of Ecuador
Mammals described in 2005
Lonchophylla